The Umingmuktogmiut are a geographically defined Copper Inuit band in the northern Canadian territory of Nunavut, Kitikmeot Region. They were located on the western coast of Kiillinnguyaq (Kent Peninsula), and also further south in eastern Bathurst Inlet around Everitt Point by the Barry Islands.  Umingmuktogmiut were notable amongst other Copper Inuit as they had a permanent community, Umingmuktog. They could hunt and fish for Arctic char, Arctic fox, barren-ground caribou, fur seals, and muskox prevalent in the area.

In 1964, a Hudson's Bay Company post moved into the area then referred to as Bay Chimo, but now known as Umingmaktok (Inuinnaqtun, "place of many muskoxen"), but, eventually, the post closed. The Umingmuktogmiut population of Umingmaktok declined in recent years with the 2006 census reporting zero population, though some families may have returned to the community.

References

External links
 Photo, 1916, Umingmuktogmiut man wearing sunglasses made of bone

Copper Inuit
Inuit groups